Star Dust (or Stardust) is a studio album by Pat Boone, released in 1958 on Dot Records.

In the United States, the album reached the top ten on both the Billboard Most Played by Jockeys and Best Selling LP's charts.

Track listing

References 

1958 albums
Pat Boone albums
Dot Records albums